Oliver James, MBE (born 5 October 1990) is a British adaptive rower who competes in international elite events. He is a triple World champion and Paralympic champion in the mixed coxed four.

References

1990 births
Living people
British male rowers
English male rowers
People from Stevenage
Paralympic rowers of Great Britain
Rowers at the 2016 Summer Paralympics
Medalists at the 2016 Summer Paralympics